Jerry verDorn (November 23, 1949 – May 1, 2022) was an American soap opera actor, best known for his role as Ross Marler in Guiding Light and Clint Buchanan in One Life to Live.

Jerry verDorn was born on November 23, 1949, in Sioux Falls, South Dakota, and attended Minnesota State University Moorhead.

VerDorn performed on stage with the Folger Theatre in Washington, D.C. On Broadway he was a standby for the role of John Tanner in Man and Superman (1978) and portrayed an investigator in Are You Now or Have You Ever Been (1979).

VerDorn became one of Guiding Light'''s longest-running cast members, debuting in the role on March 19, 1979 and portraying the character of Ross for over 26 years. He won Daytime Emmy Awards for Best Supporting Actor in 1995 and again in 1996. VerDorn also portrayed Ross in a 1983 television movie, The Cradle Will Fall, an adaptation of a book to film using several Guiding Light characters in supporting roles. In the winter of 1982, he played the role of Ross' soon to be first wife, Carrie Todd's (played by Jane Elliot), first husband Todd MacKenzie in Carrie's flashbacks during Carrie's murder trial of one of Ross' former nemeses, Diane Ballard (played by Sofia Landon Geier) who also appeared in the flashbacks.   In the fall of 1994, he played the humorous lookalike role of Howie - "Hoss" - who was the total antithesis of Ross. His last appearance as Ross aired on October 11, 2005.

On October 25, 2005, verDorn took over the role of Clint Buchanan  on ABC's One Life to Live and continued in the role until the series cancellation in 2012. On January 8, 2013, verDorn became the first actor to sign on for the revival of One Life to Live'' that aired on The Online Network.

In 1977, verDorn married Bethea Stewart. They had two sons and remained wed until his death. He died on May 1, 2022, aged 72, from cancer.

References

External links
Official website

Jerry verDorn profile
Who's in, Who's out
 

1949 births
2022 deaths
20th-century American male actors
21st-century American male actors
American male soap opera actors
Daytime Emmy Award winners
Daytime Emmy Award for Outstanding Supporting Actor in a Drama Series winners
Male actors from South Dakota
People from Sioux Falls, South Dakota
Minnesota State University Moorhead alumni
Deaths from cancer in New Jersey